is a 1956 Japanese drama film written and directed by Kaneto Shindo. It is based on a novel of the same name by Torahiko Tamiya.

Cast
 Nobuko Otowa as Sakie / Umeko
 Hiroyuki Nagato as Tamatarō
 Jūkichi Uno as Kiichi
 Chikako Hosokawa as Madame
 Tanie Kitabayashi as Nobuyo
 Akitake Kōno as Yoshizō
 Fukuko Sayo as Kurimoto's wife
 Masami Shimojō
 Ichirō Sugai as Kurimoto
 Harue Tone as Saku
 Taiji Tonoyama as Gensaku

References

External links
 

1956 films
Japanese drama films
1950s Japanese-language films
1956 drama films
Films directed by Kaneto Shindo
1950s Japanese films
Japanese black-and-white films